Madonna Adoring the Sleeping Christ Child is a c.1475 tempera on panel painting by Giovanni Bellini, measuring 77 cm by 56 cm. It forms part of the Contini Bonacossi Collection within the Uffizi Gallery in Florence.

References

Paintings of the Madonna and Child by Giovanni Bellini
1475 paintings
Paintings in the collection of the Uffizi